Jaygopal Tarkalankar (7 October 1775 —  13 April 1846) was a Bengali writer and Sanskrit scholar.

Early life
Tarkalankar was born in 1775 at Ghritapur village, Keshiary in British India. He completed his primary education from His father, Pandit Kebalram Tarkapanchanan.

Career
Tarkalankar went to Benaras and worked with Henry Thomas Colebrooke. He taught Colebrooke Bengali and Sanskrit and helped him translation projects. He worked under William Carey from 1805 to 1823 in Serampur where he composed Shikshasar. Tarkalankar also worked with John Clark Marshman and published Samachar Darpan. Immediately after its establishment of Sanskrit College in 1824 he was appointed as lecturer of Vernacular literature. In his 22 years teaching career he taught Ishwar Chandra Vidyasagar and Madan Mohan Tarkalankar. His principal aim was to re-develop the Bengali language by ridding it of its Perso-Arabic influences. Tarkalankar revised versions of Krittivas's Ramayana and Mahabharata of Kashiram Das which were published from Serampore Mission Press in 1834 and 1836 respectively.

Works
 Shikshasar
 Krishvavisayakshlokah
 Chandi
 Patrer Dhara
 Babgavidhan
Paraseek Avidhan

References

1775 births
1846 deaths
People from Nadia district
Bengali Hindus
Bengali writers
Bengali educators
18th-century Bengalis
19th-century Bengalis
Sanskrit writers
Indian Sanskrit scholars
19th-century Indian translators
18th-century Indian translators
18th-century Indian scholars
19th-century Indian scholars
18th-century Indian educators
19th-century Indian educators
18th-century Indian writers
19th-century Indian male writers
Indian male non-fiction writers
18th-century Indian non-fiction writers
19th-century Indian non-fiction writers
Sanskrit scholars from Bengal
Educators from West Bengal
Writers from West Bengal
Language reformers